Neith Nevelson, (born 16 July 1946), is an American artist best known for paintings of horses, female nudes, and male faces.

Background
Nevelson's grandmother was the sculptor Louise Nevelson, her father, Mike Nevelson (1922-2019), was a sculptor and her mother, Susan Nevelson (1924-2015), was an artist and textile designer.

Nevelson grew up in Florence, Italy, and began painting at the age of two.  She spent her childhood in Florence and New York City, and as a teenager moved to New York, to live at her grandmother's studio.

She has lived in Coconut Grove in southern Florida, since 1977.

Nevelson studied briefly at the Accademia di Belle Arti, in Florence, Italy.  As a student she concentrated on subjects she eventually became known for rather than the standard curriculum of still life drawings and landscapes, and was eventually expelled.  Her first exhibition was in 1974 at the Galleria Nuova in Florence.  Her last was in 1994; the catalog and exhibition were entitled, "Neith Nevelson: In the Middle of the Night", by Wendy Blazier.  She was influenced by Cubism, Surrealism, and Expressionism.  Some art-critics have labeled Nevelson as “Outsider” artist.

Nevelson's early work, which she has continued to experiment and embellish on to the present day, take the form of line drawings.  Her style developed into complex paintings based on the gestural fluidity of drawing, underscored by her larger art-works which tend to combine elements of all her three major themes.  As described in "Neith Nevelson: In the Middle of the Night," Neith's paintings are visions from her imaginatio], and explore the figurative, symbolic and narrative. As described by the Miami Herald's lackluster review of the same  1994 exhibition, the form of her art reflects the conflicts and contradictions of her life, living in the world of her famous grandmother and the New York art world of the 1960s, hardship and isolation from family, and remembering and longing for childhood.

She is the illustrator a forthcoming book of poems tentatively titled, "Day's Night" by Jorge Reyes.

Outside of her artistic endeavors, Nevelson is notable for political involvement in the area of abortion advocacy, for which she was jailed in Florence Italy in 1977 along with a group of advocates from the Radical Party, a left wing activist group still active in Europe.

In 2009, Neith's life was the basis of the TV show "Caso Cerrado" with Ana María Polo, broadcast daily in the US by the Telemundo Network.

Bibliography 
'Neith Nevelson: In the Middle of the Night [Illustrated] [Pamphlet],' Wendy M. Blazier, Art and Culture Center of Hollywood (September 10, 1991).
'The Artist Speaks: Louise Nevelson,' Dorothy Gees Seckler, with photographs by Ugo Mulas, Art in America, January–February, 1967.
Interview, 'An Artist was her last goal,' by Beth Mendelsohn Gilbert, Coconut Grove Sun Reporter, September 13, 1984, page 1 and 10.
'What have they done to the Grove?' Lawrence Mahoney, News/Sun Sentinel, June 16, 1985, 11-15, 20.
'My Heritage, My Blueprint,' Jane Woolridge, The Miami Herald, April 22, 1988, pp. 1–2B.
"The creative legacy and troubled world of painter Neith Nevelson,' Forrest Norman, Miami New Times, June 24–30, 2004.
The Oxford Dictionary of American Art and Artists (Hardcover) by Ann Lee Morgan (Author), Oxford University Press, USA (July 18, 2007)

References 

1946 births
Living people
American women painters
20th-century American painters
21st-century American painters
20th-century American women artists
21st-century American women artists